Pandanus decipiens is a species of plant in the family Pandanaceae. It is endemic to the Philippines.

References

Flora of the Philippines
decipiens
Vulnerable plants
Taxonomy articles created by Polbot